Buzi-ye Bala (also Romanized as Būzī-ye Bālā; also known as Būzī-ye ‘Olyā) is a village in Buzi Rural District, in the Central District of Shadegan County, Khuzestan Province, Iran. At the 2006 census, its population was 248, in 42 families.

References 

Populated places in Shadegan County